The 2010–11 Football League Two is Wycombe Wanderers F.C.'s seventeenth season of League football. This article shows statistics of the club's players in the season, and also lists all matches that the club has played during the season.

League table

Match results

Legend

Friendlies

Football League Two

FA Cup

League Cup

Football League Trophy

Squad statistics
Appearances for competitive matches only

See also
 2010–11 in English football
 Wycombe Wanderers F.C.

References

External links
 Wycombe Wanderers official website

Wycombe Wanderers F.C. seasons
Wycombe Wanderers